The Autopsy of Jane Doe is a 2016 supernatural horror film directed by André Øvredal. It stars Emile Hirsch and Brian Cox as father-and-son coroners who experience supernatural phenomena while examining the body of an unidentified woman (played by Olwen Kelly). It is Øvredal's first English-language film.

The film premiered at the Toronto International Film Festival on September 9, 2016, and was released on December 21, 2016, by IFC Midnight. It grossed $6 million at the box office.  The critical consensus at Rotten Tomatoes calls it "a smart, suggestively creepy thriller".

Plot 
The corpse of an unidentified young woman is found at the scene of an inexplicable multiple homicide. Sheriff Sheldon Burke finds no signs of forced entry, and Lieutenant Wade suggests that the victims were trying to escape.

Emma Roberts visits her boyfriend, Austin Tilden, and his father, Tommy, a small town coroner. Tommy explains that coroners in the past used to tie bells to bodies to ensure they were dead, not comatose. Sheriff Burke arrives with the mysterious body of Jane Doe, and tells Tommy that he needs the cause of death by morning. Austin postpones his date with Emma to help his father, promising to meet her later that evening.

Tommy and Austin perform the autopsy and quickly become confused. There are no external visible signs of trauma, but her wrist and ankle bones had been shattered. Her tongue has been crudely cut out, one of her molars is missing, her lungs are blackened as though she had suffered third degree burns, and her internal organs reveal numerous cuts and scarring. Jimsonweed, a paralyzing agent not native to the area, is found in her stomach. The condition of much of the body suggests that death had just occurred, while cloudiness of the corpse's eyes suggests she has been dead for several days.

Other mysterious events occur. The radio spontaneously changes stations, frequently settling on the song "Open Up Your Heart (And Let the Sunshine In)", and Austin believes he sees people standing in the morgue's hallway. Investigating, he finds their cat, Stanley, mortally wounded. Tommy quickly snaps Stanley’s neck to put him out of his misery before reluctantly incinerating the corpse.

Continuing the autopsy, Tommy finds the woman's missing tooth wrapped in a piece of cloth in her stomach. The cloth has Roman numerals, letters, and an odd diagram. Similar symbols are found on the inside of her skin. All the lights in the room suddenly explode. During the confusion, they realize other corpses in the morgue have gone missing. They decide to leave, but the elevator does not work and a fallen tree is blocking the exit door. An unseen figure leaves bruises on Tommy when he goes to the bathroom.

They return to the autopsy room and again examine the corpse. When the door locks itself, Austin hacks it with an emergency axe. Through an opening, they see one of the missing corpses. Unable to get to the cremation furnace, they set the corpse ablaze in the exam room. The fire spreads rapidly; Tommy puts it out with an extinguisher but is disturbed to find the body has not burned. When the elevator turns back on, Tommy and Austin try to escape, but the doors will not close. Panicked, Tommy uses an axe against what he believes to be one of the animated corpses. When he and Austin exit the elevator, they discover he has killed Emma, who had returned to meet Austin.

Certain that Jane Doe's corpse has been preventing them from finding out the truth about her death, they return to the examination room. Tests determine that Jane Doe's brain tissue cells remain active, proving that she is somehow still alive. Further examination of the cloth determines that the markings refer to Leviticus 20:27, which condemns witches, and the year 1693, the date of the Salem witch trials. Tommy and Austin reason that in their attempt to punish a witch, the Salem authorities instead transformed an innocent woman into a witch, rendering her immortal and allowing her to feel all of the pain her body endures even though she appears dead. Tommy offers himself to the corpse as a sacrifice, hoping she will spare Austin. Tommy's ankles and wrists shatter, mimicking the corpse's wounds.  As the wounds occur to Tommy, the corpse's own wounds begin to heal seemingly ending her curse. Tommy reaches for a knife to cut out his own tongue and complete the ritual. However, Austin reluctantly stabs his father in the chest to end his misery. Believing he hears the sheriff outside, Austin tries to flee but realizes the voice is another hallucination. Startled by a vision of Tommy's corpse, Austin trips over the railing and falls to his death.

The police arrive the next morning and are confused by another inexplicable crime scene. The corpse, showing no signs of trauma, is taken to Virginia Commonwealth University. During the ambulance ride, the radio plays "Open Up Your Heart (And Let the Sunshine In)", and the corpse's big toe twitches.

Cast 
 Emile Hirsch as Austin Tilden
 Brian Cox as Tommy Tilden
  Ophelia Lovibond as Emma Roberts
 Michael McElhatton as Sheriff Sheldon Burke
 Olwen Kelly as Jane Doe
 Jane Perry as Lieutenant Wade 
 Parker Sawyers as Trooper Cole
 Mary Duddy as Irene Daniels
 Mark Phoenix as Louis Tannis

Production 
Coming off of the success of Trollhunter, Øvredal stated that he wanted to "prove something" specifically that he could do more than found footage style films. He stated, "It's just a very specific style that you need to get into specifically for that project." The Conjuring proved to be a spark of inspiration for Øvredal, and he said, "it was such a classical horror movie that came at a time where all these movies had tried to do all kinds of different stuff and then suddenly it was like getting back to basics". After watching the film, Øvredal told his agency he wanted to "find a pure horror script", which resulted in being sent Autopsy. The script had previously appeared on the annual Black List.

Martin Sheen was initially cast as Tommy but pulled out. Although there are some prosthetics used, the role of the corpse, for the most part, was played by actress Olwen Kelly. Øvredal felt that it was necessary to have an actress for the part to help connect the audience on a human level. On some level the decision was also a practical one as Øvredal believes that doing some of the close up scenes with a prosthetic would've been impossible. Øvredal said that Kelly had the most difficult role in the film, and he credited her with making everyone else comfortable on the set. Kelly was the first person interviewed for the role. Øvredal said they performed further interviews afterward, but he instantly knew she was right for the role. One of the reasons she was selected was her knowledge of yoga, which helped her control her body and breathing. Production in the UK began in London on March 30, 2015.

The production filmed at Home Farm in Selling, Kent, which doubled as the exterior and kitchen of the Tilden family home.

Release 
The Autopsy of Jane Doe premiered at the Toronto International Film Festival on September 9, 2016. It was released in the US on December 21, 2016.

Reception 
Rotten Tomatoes, a review aggregator, reports an approval rating of 87% based on 103 reviews, with an average rating of 7.02/10. The website's critical consensus reads: "The Autopsy of Jane Doe subverts the gruesome expectations triggered by its title to deliver a smart, suggestively creepy thriller that bolsters director André Ovredal's growing reputation." Metacritic gave it a weighted average score of 65 out of 100, based on 20 critics, indicating "generally favorable reviews".

Dennis Harvey of Variety called it a "taut, yet often slyly funny scarefest", though he said the climax is unfulfilling. Though he praised the acting, Stephen Dalton of The Hollywood Reporter called the film an "unsatisfactory compromise" of art-house and exploitation film. Richard Whittaker of The Austin Chronicle wrote that Øvredal "constructs a sinister claustrophobia", then "elegantly and disturbingly unwraps the enigma".

Joe Lipsett of Bloody Disgusting rated it 5/5 stars and wrote, "Øvredal masterfully balances the requisite gore with some well-earned jump scares and a foreboding sense of doom." Writing at Dread Central, Ari Drew described it as "mostly effective". Drew complimented the acting but criticized the film's exposition and scripting near the end.

Writer Stephen King and comedian Michael Legge have both spoken in favor of the film.

References

External links 
 

2016 films
2016 horror films
Films directed by André Øvredal
American supernatural horror films
American independent films
British supernatural horror films
British independent films
British ghost films
Films about witchcraft
Films set in Richmond, Virginia
Films set in Virginia
Salem witch trials in fiction
American ghost films
2010s supernatural horror films
Patricide in fiction
Films shot in Kent
2010s English-language films
2010s American films
2010s British films